The 17 Brigade is a military formation of the Nigerian Army, which was established on 20 February 2018 for internal security duties.

History 
The 17 Brigade was established in December 2017, but was officially commissioned in February 2018. According to Army chief of staff Lieutenant General Tukur Yusuf Buratai, the establishment of the 17 Brigade is part of a wider reorganisation of the Nigerian Army.

Operations 
In 2018, the 17 Brigade conducted two internal security operations: Operation Sharar Daji and Operation Mesa, against armed banditry. In January 2019, the Brigade launched Operation Egwu Eke III in order to complement the other two ongoing operations.

Mission 
According to Lieutenant General Buratai, the 17 Brigade was established in order to address issues in the North-West Zone and in the Katsina State identified by the Nigerian Army: cattle rustling, armed robbery and armed banditry. Countering such threats includes carrying out public security duties.

References 

Military units and formations established in 2018
Military units and formations of Nigeria
2018 establishments in Nigeria